Showdown is an Electric Light Orchestra (ELO) compilation album, covering their Harvest Records years. It is the first in a very long line of Electric Light Orchestra compilation albums. It comprises 4 tracks from their debut album and 3 from ELO 2 as well as the hit single "Showdown", the first time it had featured on an album in the UK.

Track listing 

Side one

Side two

Personnel
Jeff Lynne – vocals, guitars, piano, Moog synthesizer
Roy Wood – vocals, guitar, bass, cello, wind instruments
Bev Bevan – drums, percussion
Richard Tandy – piano, keyboards, Moog synthesizer
Mike de Albuquerque – bass guitar, backing vocals
Wilfred Gibson – violin
Mike Edwards – cello
Colin Walker – cello
Bill Hunt – french horn, hunting horn
Steve Woolam – violin

References

Albums produced by Roy Wood
Albums produced by Jeff Lynne
Electric Light Orchestra compilation albums
1974 compilation albums
Harvest Records compilation albums